Charles A. Lane (August 10, 1825 - May 6, 1906) was a member of the Wisconsin State Assembly in 1882 and 1883. Additionally, he was postmaster and town clerk of Plover, Portage County, Wisconsin and a justice of the peace. In 1876, he was a candidate for county treasurer of Portage County, Wisconsin. Lane was Republican. He was born on August 10, 1825, in Springport, New York.

References

People from Cayuga County, New York
People from Plover, Wisconsin
Wisconsin postmasters
City and town clerks
American justices of the peace
Republican Party members of the Wisconsin State Assembly
Place of death missing
1825 births
Year of death missing